the Durdans Bed and Breakfast Hotel is located in the English seaside village of Mundesley in the county of Norfolk, United Kingdom. The guest house is a 4-star bed and breakfast with a Silver Award from Visit Britain.

Location 
The guest house was built in the Edwardian period and is set in grounds of over two acres. It is on the Trunch road on the south west outskirts of the village of Mundesley. it is approximately 20 minutes walk from the main beach in Mundesley.

References

Mundesley
Hotels in North Norfolk
Hotels in Norfolk